International College Portsmouth (or ICP) is the on-campus college of the University of Portsmouth in Portsmouth, UK. It is a member of Navitas.

The college offers undergraduate and postgraduate programs for international students (and EU students for postgraduate pathways) in subjects including Business, Accounting & Finance, Law, Engineering, Science, Mathematics, Creative Technologies and Computing.

Campus 
ICP is situated in the heart of the University of Portsmouth city centre campus, University Quarter. ICP is reached by train (Portsmouth & Southsea Station) and is 20 minutes away from Southampton Airport.

Pathways 
ICP students can begin their undergraduate program with English Language, Stage 1 (University Foundation) or Stage 2 (First Year Degree). Students can begin their postgraduate program with English Language or Stage 1 (Pre-Master's). All programs lead to a degree from the University of Portsmouth.

Undergraduate programs
  Accounting and Finance
  Architecture, Design and Fashion 
  Business and Management 
  Computing
  Media and Games Technologies
  Engineering
  Law and International Relations
  Mathematics
  Property and Surveying
  Science

Postgraduate programs
 Business and Management
 Education
 Finance
 International Relations and Criminal Justice
 Logistics and Supply Chain Management
 Science and Engineering

References

External links 
 ICP website
 University website
 Navitas website

University of Portsmouth